At the 2008 Commonwealth Youth Games, the athletics events were held at the Shree Shiv Chhatrapati Sports Complex in Pune, India from 14 to 16 October. A total of 34 events were contested, which were split evenly between the sexes. After the swimming programme, the athletics competition had the next most number of events.

Medal summary

Boys

Girls

References

Results
 

2008
Commonwealth Youth Games
2008 Commonwealth Youth Games
2008 in youth sport